Senecio bahioides is a flowering plant species of the genus Senecio and family Asteraceae. It is a native of Chile.

References

External links

bahioides
Flora of Chile